The North Carolina General Assembly of the U.S. state of North Carolina has convened many times since the state declared its independence from the British Crown and established a constitution in December 1776 during the Fifth North Carolina Provincial Congress.

Prior to 1957, the General Assembly convened in January at a time fixed by the Constitution of North Carolina. From 1957 through 1967, sessions convened in February at a time fixed by the Constitution. The 1969 General Assembly was the first to convene on a date fixed by law after elimination of the constitutionally fixed date. The assembly now convenes on the third Wednesday after the second Monday in January after the November election.

History of the legislatures
The new General Assembly, which first convened in April 1777, consisted of a Senate, which had one member from each county (regardless of population), and a House of Commons, which had two members representing each county, plus one each from certain towns/districts. 
 Only protestant men owning land (100 acres for the House of Commons, 300 acres for the Senate) could serve. Early assemblies met in multiple locations in North Carolina when there was not a state capital.
 In 1789 at the Fayetteville Convention, the constitution was amended to substitute the word "Christian" for "Protestant".  Fayetteville was also added as a borough/town.
 In 1792, a commission was appointed to select a site to build a permanent state capital. The commission members favored land owned by Colonel John Hinton across the Neuse River, but the night before the final vote the committee adjourned to the home of Joel Lane in Wake County for an evening of food and spirits. The next day, the vote went in Lane's favor and the capital has been in Raleigh ever since. 
 In the North Carolina Constitutional Convention of 1835, the constitution was amended to make the Governor elected by the people, but the legislature still elected all other officials. Amendments also set the number of senators at 50 and the number of commoners at 120. Senators would now be elected by districts representing approximately equal numbers of citizens, rather than by counties. Members of the House were still elected by county, but more populous counties were entitled to more representatives.
 In 1868, a new constitution changed the name of the House of Commons to the House of Representatives. It also established the office of Lieutenant Governor. Previously, the Speaker of the Senate was the constitutional successor to the Governor in case of death or resignation. Property qualifications for holding office were also abolished. This constitution also established administrative townships in every county.  The power to elect executive officers and judges was taken from legislators and given to the people in this session.  The House of Commons was renamed as the House of Representatives. The Speaker of the Senate was abolished and the newly-created Lt. Governor became the President of the Senate when it was in session; next in line became the President Pro Tempore elected by members.
 In 1868, African Americans were first elected to the General Assembly (fifteen representatives and two senators). But after Democrats consolidated power in the late 1890s, no African Americans were elected until Henry Frye (a Democrat) in 1968.
 Lillian Exum Clement became the first female member of the General Assembly in 1921
 The North Carolina Constitution was rewritten in 1971.

Legislatures
The following table shows when and where the North Carolina General Assembly met.  The numbered order indicates a new election.

Conventions
Several state conventions were held to ratify state and national constitutions:
1788, Hillsborough Convention, United States Constitution
1789, Fayetteville Convention, U.S. Constitution
1835, North Carolina Constitutional Convention of 1835 in Raleigh
1861 Convention
First Session, Raleigh, May 20-June 28, 1861
Second Session, Raleigh, November 18-December 18, 1861
Third Session, Raleigh, January 20-February 26, 1862
Fourth Session, Raleigh, April 21-May 13, 1862
1865 Convention 
First Session, Raleigh, October 2-October 19, 1865
Second Session, Raleigh, May 24-June 25, 1866
1868 Convention, Raleigh, January 14-March 17, 1868
1875 Convention, Raleigh, September 6-October 11, 1875

See also
 History of North Carolina

References

External links
 
 

Legislatures
Legislature
 
North Carolina
North Carolina